Jennifer Dahlgren Fitzner (born 21 April 1984) is an Argentine hammer thrower. Having spent much of her life in the United States, she competed as an amateur for the University of Georgia. She set the US collegiate hammer record and was the NCAA Outdoor champion in both 2006 and 2007. She is a three-time gold medallist at the South American Championships and won the bronze medal at the 2007 Pan American Games.

Dahlgren has represented Argentina at the 2004 and 2008 Summer Olympics, as well as having competed at the World Championships in Athletics on three occasions. She first broke the South American record in the discipline in 2004 and has raised it several metres to her current best of 73.74 m. She is one of the continent's top performers in the event, in which South American athletes are historically weak. In 2010 she won the Konex Award Merit Diploma as one of the five best Athletes from the last decade in Argentina.

Career
Dahlgren's first major tournament was the 2000 World Junior Championships in Athletics, but she did not make the final, finishing 11th in the qualifying stages. She finished fourth at the 2001 World Youth Championships, but won the South American Junior Championships and took second at the Pan American Junior Championships that year. Dahlgren took fifth at the World Junior Championships in Athletics the following year and again topped the podium in the 2002 South American Junior Championships in Athletics. The 2003 season proved to be a breakthrough year: she set the South American junior record in the discipline and won at the Pan American Junior Championships.

Dahlgren reached the championship podium three times in 2004, finishing third at the NCAA Women's Outdoor Track and Field Championship for the University of Georgia with a South American record of 66.12 m, taking the gold at the South American U23 Championships in Athletics and winning a bronze medal at the 2004 Ibero-American Championships. However, she did not fare as well at the 2004 Summer Olympics, managing a throw of only 59.52 m. In 2005, she improved her record to 67.07 m and bettered her previous performance at the NCAA Championships with a second-place finish. She set a championship record of 65.05 m to win the 2005 South American Championships in Athletics – her first senior title. She did not continue her momentum into the 2005 World Championships in Athletics and she threw three fouls to be eliminated in the qualifying round.

In 2006, she won the NCAA Indoor Weight throw title and set a new US collegiate record in the hammer with a throw of 71.78 m at the SEC Championships – the fourth time she had improved her South American record that year. She went on to win her first outdoor NCAA hammer throw title a few months later. Dahlgren improved her championship record to 69.07 m to take a second continental gold at the 2006 South American Championships in Athletics. She also won at the 2006 South American Games, which acted as the South American Under-23 Athletics Championships that year.

She started 2007 by winning the NCAA championships with a mark of 70.72 m (her final amateur title) and throwing a new South American record of 72.01 m soon afterwards in Greensboro, North Carolina. She scored her first major championship medal at the 2007 Pan American Games, taking the bronze with a throw of 68.37 m behind Cubans Yipsi Moreno and Arasay Thondike. Representing Argentina at the 2007 World Championships in Athletics, she threw 65.64 m in the qualifying round but this was not enough to progress to the final.

She suffered a foot injury in 2008, which affected her performances early in the season. She recovered somewhat in time for the 2008 Ibero-American Championships and was the silver medallist behind Rosa Rodríguez. She had a best mark of 66.35 m at the 2008 Summer Olympics, leaving her as the best South American performer but in 29th place overall. She had a below par performance at the 2009 South American Championships in Athletics, throwing 63.81 m for the bronze medal. Despite this, she was also the best South American performer in the hammer at the 2009 World Championships in Athletics, where her throw of 68.90 m was good enough for 17th, but not enough to make the final round.

She came under the tutelage of fellow Argentine Marcelo Pugliese, a former Olympic hammer thrower. At the start of the 2010 season, Dahlgren set another best of 73.74 m in Buenos Aires.

Personal life
Dahlgren frequently moved with her family in her youth, which meant that she spent much time living in the United States. She returned to Argentina at the age of 13, but took time to feel comfortable with the language and settle into her school. However, after settling she was once again uprooted as her family moved to Texas. Her mother Irene Fitzner competed for Argentina as a sprint athlete at the 1972 Summer Olympics. Dahlgren's younger brother, Paul, attended Baylor University in Waco, Texas.

Dahlgren's great-grandfather was Swedish, hence her Swedish surname.

Personal bests

All information taken from IAAF profile.

Achievements

References

External links
 
 
 
 
 

1984 births
Living people
Argentine female hammer throwers
Olympic athletes of Argentina
Athletes (track and field) at the 2004 Summer Olympics
Athletes (track and field) at the 2008 Summer Olympics
Athletes (track and field) at the 2012 Summer Olympics
Athletes (track and field) at the 2016 Summer Olympics
Pan American Games bronze medalists for Argentina
Pan American Games medalists in athletics (track and field)
Athletes (track and field) at the 2007 Pan American Games
Athletes (track and field) at the 2011 Pan American Games
Athletes (track and field) at the 2015 Pan American Games
Athletes (track and field) at the 2019 Pan American Games
Medalists at the 2007 Pan American Games
South American Games medalists in athletics
South American Games gold medalists in athletics
South American Games silver medalists for Argentina
Competitors at the 2014 South American Games
Athletes (track and field) at the 2018 South American Games
World Athletics Championships athletes for Argentina
Argentine people of Swedish descent
Argentine people of German descent
Athletes from Buenos Aires
University of Georgia alumni
Ibero-American Championships in Athletics winners
20th-century Argentine women
21st-century Argentine women